Morris Gachamba (born 1932) is a basement mechanic in Kenya, a country in East Africa. Gachamba is known for having built and flown his own plane in 1968.

Plane project
In the 1960s, Gachamba became friends with an English tourist he would go out fishing with.  The tourist owned a small plane and took Gachamba out for a short trip around Lake Naivasha.  Gachamba became enamored with flying and soon wanted to build his own.  Come the 1970s, he became the first Kenyan to build an airplane.

Education 
Gachamba dropped out of Kenya's Standard Four after Ambrose Wambugu, a Maths teacher beat him for not being able to answer a question on addition of fractions.  He has commented on his education experience, "“I was never one to remember things easily and that made me a bad student."  But, that hasn't turned him off the idea of becoming a teacher.  He's said, “I would really like students to come and learn from me. I have a lot of practical knowledge and I want to leave it to them.”

References 

1932 births
Living people
Kenyan engineers
People from Nyeri County